The 2016 Milan Ciga Vasojević Cup season is the 10th season of the Serbian national women's basketball cup tournament.

The competition started on 19 March and concluded with the Final on 20 March 2016.

Teams
Four teams competed in this years cup.

Bracket

Semifinals

Final

References

External links
 Basketball Federation of Serbia 

Milan Ciga Vasojević Cup
Milan
Serbia